The LNB Pro A Best Coach, or LNB Pro A Coach of the Year, is the annual award of the top-tier level men's professional club basketball league in France, the LNB Pro A.

Best Coach winners

See also
LNB Pro A Awards
LNB Pro A

References

External links
Official Site 

European basketball awards
LNB Pro A awards